Boggstown is an unincorporated community in Sugar Creek Township, Shelby County, in the U.S. state of Indiana.

History
In early 1861, just before the Civil War, participants at a meeting in Boggstown approved a resolution to join the Confederacy in the event of hostilities. Whatever the reason for this resolution, it had no practical effect. The town remained loyal to the United States and the state of Indiana throughout the conflict, and local soldiers fought exclusively on the Union side.

The community was platted in 1867, and named for Joseph Boggs, an early settler. The Boggstown post office has been in operation since 1867.

Boggstown once contained a school which was discontinued at an unknown date.

Notable people
Actress Marjorie Main, best known as Ma Kettle, spent her teenage years here growing up on the first road north of town (300 North).

References

Unincorporated communities in Shelby County, Indiana
Unincorporated communities in Indiana
Indianapolis metropolitan area